Mongrels is a British puppet-based musical situation comedy series first broadcast on BBC Three between 22 June and 10 August 2010, with a making-of documentary entitled "Mongrels Uncovered" broadcast on 11 August 2010. A second and final series of Mongrels began airing on 7 November 2011.

The series revolves around the lives of five anthropomorphic animals who hang around the back of a pub in Millwall, the Isle of Dogs, London. The characters are Nelson, a metrosexual fox (voiced by Rufus Jones, performed by Andy Heath); Destiny, an Afghan hound (voiced by Lucy Montgomery, performed by Richard Coombs and Sue Beattie); Marion, a "borderline-retarded" cat (voiced by Dan Tetsell, performed by Warrick Brownlow-Pike); Kali, a grudge-bearing pigeon (voiced by Katy Brand, performed by Iestyn Evans); and Vince, Nelson's older brother, a sociopathic foul-mouthed fox (voiced by Paul Kaye, performed by various puppeteers).

The show is aimed at an adult audience, features "neutering, incontinence, cannibalism and catnip overdoses" and has several humour styles such as slapstick and farce. For example, the first episode begins with a scene in which Marion, portrayed as desperately trying to revive his deceased owner, learns she has actually been dead for four months, whereupon he casually gives his cat friends permission to eat her. Mongrels has attracted accusations of plagiarism, with claims that Mongrels stole ideas from a similar Channel 4 show called Pets.

On 18 January 2012 it was announced via Twitter that Mongrels had not been renewed for a third series by the BBC due to a decision made by Zai Bennett.

Plot

Mongrels looks at the lives of five animals that hang around the back of a pub called The Lord Nelson in Millwall, on the Isle of Dogs in the East End of London. The hero of the series is Nelson (Vulpus metrosexualus), a fox who lives a metrosexual lifestyle. Described as: "The only wild fox in East London with subscriptions to all the major broadsheets (excluding The Sunday Times), Nelson is, as he never tires of introducing himself at dinner parties... 'An urbane fox!'"

Nelson's love interest is Destiny (Canis selfabsorbedbitchicus), an Afghan hound. However, Destiny has no interest in Nelson. She is the pet dog of Gary (Tony Way), the landlord of The Lord Nelson. However, like the other humans that appear in the series, he cannot understand what Destiny or what the other animals are saying. Elsewhere there is Marion (Felis retardicus), an idiotic cat to whom Nelson acts as a father-figure. Marion has been abandoned by several owners and is very corruptible. Then there is Kali (Aves aggravaticus), a pigeon who likes to revel in the misfortune of others. She speaks with a Black English accent. She has several grudges, including a hatred of all humans and foxes for the way they treat birds. Lastly, there is Vince, Nelson's friend (Vulpus cuntitcus), a violent, foul-mouthed fox who considers himself a proper animal. Almost all his lines contain at least one swear word that is always bleeped over.

There is no over-riding story arc between episodes, but each episode does contain recurring elements. During each episode there are cutaways from the main plot to create extra gags. Most episodes also feature at least one celebrity appearance and every episode features a comic song.

Cast and characters
Rufus Jones as the voice of Nelson, an urban fox who has embraced a middle-class, metrosexual lifestyle. Operated by Andy Heath
Dan Tetsell as the voice of Marion, a homeless Persian alley cat. Operated by Warrick Brownlow-Pike
Lucy Montgomery as the voice of Destiny, a beautiful Afghan Hound. Operated by Richard Coombs and Sue Beattie
Katy Brand as the voice of Kali, a cynical, vindictive and street smart pigeon. Operated by Iestyn Evans
Paul Kaye as the voice of Vince, a violent, foul-mouthed sociopathic fox.
Tony Way as Gary, Destiny's owner.
Ruth Bratt – various incidental characters.

Creation
The show took five years to make. The idea was first suggested between the creator and director of Mongrels, Adam Miller, and the show's head puppeteer, Andy Heath, when they worked on ITV children's show Ripley and Scuff.

Miller described Mongrels as: "an adult sitcom, trying to do for puppetry what American shows like The Simpsons have done for animation. Obviously that's aiming very high. Think [stage musical] Avenue Q meets Family Guy but with puppet animals." He also said that: "We wanted to make something that had the pace of an American animation but with British sensibilities, that was adult, but not crude, that was based in the realities of the animal world, and that didn't rely on the puppets to do the comedy."

The original idea, known as The Un-Natural World was of an urban fox living in Brixton called Nelson, who was so used to living in the city that he had lost any sense of being an animal. It also featured a cat, Marion, who was trying to encourage Nelson to be more animal-like.

While Miller was working on a BBC Three sitcom he pitched the idea to producer Stephen McCrum. McCrum criticised the way Miller ended the first script, which ended with Nelson and Marion leaving where they live. McCrum told him it was best to set the series in a single place rather than have the characters move from one place to another. McCrum then suggested taking Nelson and Marion, and writing a script about them. Later, another writer, Jon Brown came in to write and at this time rules were set out with regards to writing the show, such as the animals could not be dressed in clothes unless it was in a flashback sequence or during a song.

The new script was then pitched to the BBC. The pitch tape they made was based on the same pitch used by The Muppet Show. This was done as a tribute to it, with Miller arguing that when The Muppet Show did it, "it just must have just knocked the socks off the people who saw it, because it's like nothing you've ever seen before, and we thought: 'Why fix what ain't broke, so we did our own very British version of that." The producers liked it but did not fully understand what the show was about. Miller, Brown and a third writer, Daniel Peak began to write scripts over a period of four years. A pilot was eventually filmed and the BBC commissioned a full series, targeted at adults. Despite the adult nature, Miller did not want to make the show too crude. Eight episodes were filmed so as to spread the cost of making the series over each episode.

Character development
When writing for the commissioned series began, the character of Nelson was originally depicted as being brash and obnoxious. This was later changed to make him more metrosexual, middle class and likeable. Developing the character of Destiny, Nelson's love interest, was a challenge to the programme makers. Kali was created to be a villain, with Miller describing her as a "Hitler-figure". Vince was partly based on the brash version of Nelson.

In the unbroadcast pilot We Are Mongrels, another character was included called Debbie. Debbie was a suicidal chicken who never left her coop. However, it was decided that the character did not go anywhere and could not be sustained for a full series, so the character was axed. Another chicken character called Wendy appeared in the first broadcast episode as a reference to Debbie. Both characters had the same voice actress, Ruth Bratt, who performed Wendy's voice in exactly the same manner as that of Debbie.

Casting
Rufus Jones was among the first people auditioned for the role of Nelson. After several other auditions with other actors, Jones was called upon to play the part. Paul Kaye at one time provided the voice for Nelson before taking the role of Vince.

It was then decided by the creators to make Marion a foreign character and to find an accent that reflected this. There was discussion about Iranian-British comic Omid Djalili playing the role. In the end, Tetsell was cast after auditioning with a poor version of Djalili's Iranian accent. Tetsell describes the voice as a mixture of, "every accent on the planet", but with the joke that Marion was meant to be a Persian cat.

Puppets
When the puppet for Marion was first created, he was depicted as having stripy fur, but looked more like a mouse in the eyes of the crew, so his puppet was changed. Marion's image was based on topless photos of the comic actor James Corden.

The show's puppeteers claim there are different problems working with different characters. For example, Destiny is the largest puppet and so moving her is more difficult. As Marion spends much of his time sitting on top of a rubbish bin, his puppeteer, Brownlow-Pike, has to stand inside a bottomless bin for long periods of time. Kali is said to be the most difficult puppet to work with, because as she has no hands she is limited to what she can hold.

Recording
The show was originally entitled We Are Mongrels, but the title had to be changed for two reasons: one was that the title was too similar to another BBC Three comedy show, We Are Klang. The other is that none of the characters were mongrels. Therefore, new suggestions were called for. Rejected titles included I, Nelson; Humans! Everywhere!; Undergrowth and Never Been Stroked. The last of these titles was rejected after one of the show's additional writers, Danielle Ward; "said it sounded like 'a makeover show for virgins'." During this time the crew referred to the show as Mongrels and it eventually became the show's title.

When writing for Vince the writers blanked out all of the characters swearing like it is done on the show, but when it came to recording the programme the swear words had to be put in for Kaye to read them. During read-throughs of the scripts, a toy horn was honked whenever Kaye swore to give an idea of what it would sound like during the programme.

The show also aims to be environmentally friendly in its production. A report from the BBC's in-house publication Ariel: "From reusable water bottles filled from tanks of tap water to double-sided scripts, Mongrels is aiming to be the most sustainable production at the BBC." The production team also use reusable or compostable cutlery in their canteen, reducing any future merchandise packaging to just a barcode, and replacing conventional lighting with fluorescent tube lights. This last move reduced the electricity bill for the second series by a third, saving £500 a week.

Cancellation
On 18 January 2012, Tetsell revealed on Twitter that Mongrels had been cancelled, saying: "we've all been sacked now".

Miller posted another, longer message online saying:

Reception
Mongrels was given mixed reviews, with some considering its quality to be inconsistent, with a reviewer for tvBite.com saying that the show was "a bit hit and miss" but also that, "even the laugh-free moments have a well-written sheen." and that the work put into the jokes show. Jane Simon of the Daily Mirror wrote: "While most of it is very funny, some of the gags about Harold Shipman completely misjudge the tone. Maybe the age group BBC3 is aimed at reckon anything is fair game for comedy." The Independent'''s Tom Sutcliffe said that: "It does have its laughs, though, because the script isn't entirely about crass shock value", but that the sitcom, while aimed at adults, is "not really for grown-ups." Sam Wollaston of The Guardian was mainly positive about Mongrels, but said that the main reason he thought it was funny was because it depicted "cuddly children's toys [...] saying things you wouldn't normally expect cuddly children's toys to say. Like 'You are such a cock-end'", and that, "the novelty will wear off at some point not too far away".

Awards and nominationsMongrels won the Royal Television Society Craft and Design Award 2009–2010 for "Production Design – Entertainment and Non-Drama" led by production designer Simon Rogers. It was also nominated for the award for "Tape and Film Editing – Entertainment and Situation Comedy" led by film editor Nigel Williams, but lost to Pete versus Life.

In 2011, Brown won the BAFTA Craft Award for "Break-through Talent". The series was nominated for the Ursa Major Award for "Best Anthropomorphic Dramatic Short Work or Series" in 2010 (series 1) and 2011 (series 2).

In 2012, Andy Heath & Iestyn Evans won the Royal Television Society Craft and Design Award 2011/12 for special effects in Mongrels Series 2, beating Downton Abbey and Great Expectations in the process.

Appearances in other programmes
On 13 August 2011, the cast of Mongrels took part in the first ever Comedy Prom, in which they performed the song "Middle Class is Magical" from the seventh episode of the first series, "Marion The Superfluous Feed Character". The performance was broadcast live on BBC Radio 3, and later broadcast on BBC Two on 27 August 2011.

In November 2021, Nelson and Marion reappeared in a Puppet Aid sketch for the BBC's annual Children in Need telethon.

Plagiarism accusationsMongrels has attracted anger from production company Fit2Fill which claimed the BBC "ripped off" their 2001 Channel 4 sitcom Pets. Fit2Fill claimed they received 30 emails from people saying the series were similar, and they once pitched the idea of Pets to then BBC head of comedy Mark Freeland, who also acted as the executive producer of Mongrels.

The producer of Pets, Andrew Barclay said: "We checked the BBC's Mongrels website this morning and the Beeb do appear to have hired the same puppet builders and puppeteers as Pets. We also notice that Mongrels' executive producer is Mark Freeland, to whom we did once pitch a Pets follow-up show."

The co-creator and co-producer of Pets, Brian West, went on to post his views on a BBC blog post about Mongrels. Following this, a telephone conversation between West and Mongrels producer McCrum took place where McCrum, "claimed that no-one from the BBC production team had watched Pets before or during the development and production of their series." From this West responded that: "We might therefore conclude that any similarities between the two shows is 100% coincidental." West left people to judge for themselves whether Pets had been copied.

Afterwards, Andy Heath, a puppet builder who worked for both Mongrels and Pets, said on the same blog that he met Adam Miller in 2002 after he [Heath] finished working on Pets in 2000, to work on Ripley and Scuff. Miller then began developing the idea for Mongrels in 2004. Heath then went on to say:

Merchandise
The first series of Mongrels was released on DVD (region 2 and 4) and Blu-ray (region free) on 16 August 2010. The DVD and Blu-rays featured the unbroadcast pilot amongst their extras. A planned DVD and Blu-ray release of the second series was cancelled,. The DVD release of series two was later rescheduled for October 2012. The second series was made available on DVD on 8 October 2012 in the UK, available separately or as a boxset with series 1. A Blu-ray release of series 2 should become available soon, but no official date has been set for such a release as of June 2014. Both series are now available on iTunes and Netflix.

See alsoMeet the Feebles''

References

External links

2010s British sitcoms
2010 British television series debuts
2011 British television series endings
British black comedy television shows
BBC television sitcoms
English-language television shows
Television shows involved in plagiarism controversies
British television shows featuring puppetry
Television shows set in London